Mount Howard is a prominent  mountain summit located west of Lake Wenatchee in Chelan County of Washington state. This peak is set approximately midway between Stevens Pass and Lake Wenatchee, on land managed by the Okanogan–Wenatchee National Forest. Precipitation runoff from the peak drains into tributaries of the Wenatchee River. The mountain may have been named by a survey party, and first published in 1887.

Geology

The North Cascades features some of the most rugged topography in the Cascade Range with craggy peaks, ridges, and deep glacial valleys. Geological events occurring many years ago created the diverse topography and drastic elevation changes over the Cascade Range leading to various climate differences. 

The history of the formation of the Cascade Mountains dates back millions of years ago to the late Eocene Epoch. With the North American Plate overriding the Pacific Plate, episodes of volcanic igneous activity persisted. In addition, small fragments of the oceanic and continental lithosphere called terranes created the North Cascades about 50 million years ago. Gneissic rock of the Nason Terrane is exposed on Mt. Howard.

During the Pleistocene period dating back over two million years ago, glaciation advancing and retreating repeatedly scoured and shaped the landscape. Uplift and faulting in combination with glaciation have been the dominant processes which have created the tall peaks and deep valleys of the North Cascades area.

Climate
Lying east of the Cascade crest, the area around Mt. Howard is a bit drier than areas to the west. Summers can bring warm temperatures and occasional thunderstorms. Most weather fronts originate in the Pacific Ocean, and travel east toward the Cascade Mountains. As fronts approach, they are forced upward by the peaks of the Cascade Range, causing them to drop their moisture in the form of rain or snowfall onto the Cascades (Orographic lift). As a result, the western slopes of the Cascades experience high precipitation, especially during the winter months in the form of snowfall. During winter months, weather is usually cloudy, but, due to high pressure systems over the Pacific Ocean that intensify during summer months, there is often little or no cloud cover during the summer.

See also

 Geology of the Pacific Northwest
 Geography of the North Cascades

Gallery

References

External links
 Weather forecast: Mount Howard

Mountains of Chelan County, Washington
Mountains of Washington (state)
Cascade Range
North Cascades
North American 2000 m summits